Marcelo Contini (born 20 April 1989) is a Brazilian judoka.

He is the gold medallist of the 2017 Judo Grand Prix Cancún in the -73 kg category.

References

External links

 

1989 births
Living people
Brazilian male judoka
20th-century Brazilian people
21st-century Brazilian people